The 2009 UCLA Bruins baseball team represented the University of California, Los Angeles in the 2009 NCAA Division I baseball season. The Bruins played their home games in Jackie Robinson Stadium, and finished the season with a 27–29 overall record. With a 15–12 record in conference play, UCLA tied Oregon State as the #3 team in the Pacific-10 Conference, behind #1 Arizona State and #2 Washington State. Even though UCLA won the three-game season series 2–1, Oregon State was invited to the 2009 NCAA Division I baseball tournament instead of UCLA due to their better overall record (37–19).

Previous season 
The Bruins completed the 2008 season with a 33–27 overall record, and finished third in the Pac-10 Conference behind #1 Arizona State and #2 Stanford. The 2008 season ended at the Fullerton Regionals when the Bruins lost two games in a row to Cal State Fullerton.

Roster

Schedule 

! style="background:#536895;color:#FFB300;"| Regular Season
|- valign="top"

|- align="center" bgcolor="#ccffcc"
| 1 || February 20 || UC Davis || Jackie Robinson Stadium || 13–1 || R. Rasmussen (1–0) || J. McChesney (0–1) || None || 784 || 1–0 || –
|- align="center" bgcolor="#ccffcc"
| 2 || February 21 || UC Davis || Jackie Robinson Stadium || 5–2 || G. Cole (1–0) || A. Suiter (0–1) || T. Bauer (1) || 848 || 2–0 ||–
|- align="center" bgcolor="#FFE6E6"
| 3 || February 22 || UC Davis || Jackie Robinson Stadium || 8–7 11 || T. Bauer (0–1) || D. Quist (1–0) || None || 682 || 2–1 ||–
|- align="center" bgcolor="#FFE6E6"
| 4 || February 24 || UC Santa Barbara || Caesar Uyesaka Stadium || 7–6 || M. Grace (0–1) || M. Ford (1–0) || D. Meals (1) || 350 || 2–2 || –
|- align="center" bgcolor="#FFE6E6"
| 5 || February 25 || UC Riverside || Jackie Robinson Stadium || 11–1 || G. Brooks (0–1) || R. Platt (1–0) || None || 407 || 2–3 || –
|- align="center" bgcolor="#FFE6E6"
| 6 || February 27 || Rice || Minute Maid Park || 5–4 || T. Bauer (0–2) || Jo. Rogers (2–0) || None || 6,879 || 2–4 || –
|- align="center" bgcolor="#FFE6E6"
| 7 || February 28 || Baylor || Minute Maid Park || 5–1 || G. Cole (1–1) || K. Volz (1–0) || W. Kempf (1) || 13,928 || 2–5 || –
|-

Rankings

UCLA Bruins in the 2009 MLB Draft 
The following members of the UCLA Bruins baseball program were drafted in the 2009 Major League Baseball Draft.

References 

Ucla Bruins
UCLA Bruins baseball seasons
UCLA